Basketball was among the sports contested at the 2021 Southeast Asian Games in Vietnam. The basketball tournament in the games featured four events: traditional 5x5 basketball and 3x3 basketball, for both men and women. The competition was held at Thanh Trì District Sporting Hall in Hanoi, Vietnam.

Competition schedule
3x3 basketball was held from 13 to 14  May 2022 while the regular 5x5 basketball event will be held from 16 to 22 May 2022.

Participating nations

Medalists

Medal table

References

External links
 Official website 

Basketball